Episodes is a sitcom created and written by David Crane and Jeffrey Klarik, which premiered on Showtime on January 9, 2011, and on BBC Two on January 10, 2011. The show follows Sean and Beverly Lincoln, a British writing couple who travel to Hollywood to remake their successful show, Lyman's Boys, as an American series.

Series overview

Episodes

Season 1 (2011)

Season 2 (2012)

Season 3 (2014)

Season 4 (2015)
On December 11, 2013, Episodes was renewed for a nine-episode fourth series which was filmed in 2014 and began airing on January 11, 2015.

Season 5 (2017)
On June 10, 2015, Episodes was renewed for a fifth season to begin filming in 2016 and to begin airing in 2017. Andrew Paul has confirmed that he will be a guest star. On April 11, 2016, it was announced that the fifth season would be the last and contain seven episodes.

Ratings

References

External links
 
 
 List of 

Lists of British sitcom episodes
Lists of American sitcom episodes